Sipalolasma greeni is a species of spider of the genus Sipalolasma. It is endemic to Sri Lanka. The carapace and legs are deep brown in color. The abdomen is black. The known length is about 22 mm. The species was first found from Punduloya, Sri Lanka.

See also 
 List of Barychelidae species

References

Endemic fauna of Sri Lanka
Barychelidae
Spiders of Asia
Spiders described in 1900